Nesogordonia papaverifera is a species of flowering plant. Traditionally included in the family Sterculiaceae, it is included in the expanded Malvaceae in the APG and most subsequent systematics.

It is found in Benin, Cameroon, Central African Republic, Republic of the Congo, Ivory Coast, Gabon, Ghana, Liberia, Nigeria, and Sierra Leone. It is becoming rare due to by habitat loss.

References

papaverifera
Flora of West Tropical Africa
Vulnerable plants
Taxonomy articles created by Polbot
Taxa named by Auguste Chevalier